Kumarwala is a city in Punjab, Pakistan.

Nearby Cities and Towns  
West North East South  
Bokha (0.9 nm) Mochipura (0.7 nm)
Gulhari (1.2 nm) Jalla (1.9 nm) Kotla Bahlol (1.5 nm)

References
https://web.archive.org/web/20070628234601/http://plasma.nationalgeographic.com/mapmachine/
http://www.fallingrain.com/world/PK/4/Kumarwala.html
https://web.archive.org/web/20101027185129/http://earthsearch.net/featureIndex.php?type=int&start=2581000&end=2582000

Villages in Punjab, Pakistan